Michael Zittle Jr. (October 5, 1798 – July 5, 1877) or The Wizard of South Mountain was an American occultist, ceremonial magician, author, and mountaineer. He was born to a German father, American mother, and was one of seven children. Zittle became popular in the area as healer, he would offer his services to alleviate a wide array of difficulties, such as compelling a thief to return stolen property, providing a “sure cure for fever," closing a wound from firearms, curing the bite of a mad dog and “dispelling the fear of the darkness of night.”

A Friend In Need
A Friend in Need; Or, Secret Science was a Handbook written by Zittle in 1845 on how to perform witchcraft. According to legend, after publication of the book Zittle lost his powers as a result of trying to commoditize his supernatural powers. In 1975, a copy of his book was found by Boonsboro resident Pauline Routzahn.

References

1798 births
1877 deaths
American people of German descent
Witchcraft in folklore and mythology
Supernatural legends
Maryland folklore
People from Washington County, Maryland
Burials in Maryland
19th-century mystics
19th-century American writers
American occultists
American folklore
19th-century occultists
Witchcraft in Maryland